Lorius (born 1932) is a French glaciologist. He is director emeritus of research at CNRS. He was the director of the Laboratoire de glaciologie et géophysique de l'environnement in Grenoble from 1983 to 1988.

He has taken part in more than 20 polar expeditions, mostly to Antarctica, and has helped organise many international collaborations, notably the Vostok Station ice core. He was instrumental in the discovery and interpretation of the palaeo-atmosphere information within ice cores.

Awards 

 commandeur of the Légion d'honneur, 2009
 Blue Planet Prize, 2008
 Vernadsky medal of the EGU, 2006 
 CNRS Gold medal, 2002 
 Balzan Prize 2001 for climatology
 Tyler Prize for Environmental Achievement, 1996
 officer of the Légion d'honneur, 1998
 member of the French Academy of Sciences, 1994
 Italgas Prize, 1994
 Belgica Medal, 1989
 Humboldt Prize, 1988
 Bower Medal and Prize, Franklin Institute, 2017, 2017

Bibliography

 Lorius, Claude; Carpentier, Laurent (2011). Voyage dans l'anthropocène: cette nouvelle ère dont nous sommes les héros. (in French). Paris: Actes Sud

 (originally released in 1987 written by Bertrand Imbert, Claude Lorius is the co-author of the revised edition released in 2007)
 U.S. edition – 
 UK edition –

See also
Ice and the Sky, a documentary film about Lorius' work in Antarctica

External links
 – biography in French or English
  Claude Lorius International Balzan Prize Foundation

20th-century French scientists
20th-century earth scientists
21st-century French scientists
21st-century earth scientists
French climatologists
French glaciologists
1932 births
Living people
Scientists from Besançon
Members of the French Academy of Sciences
Commandeurs of the Légion d'honneur
French National Centre for Scientific Research scientists
Foreign Members of the Russian Academy of Sciences
Members of Academia Europaea
Research directors of the French National Centre for Scientific Research